AUA may stand for:

Association
American Unitarian Association, a Unitarian religious denomination in the United States and Canada from 1828 to 1961
American Urological Association
Asian Universities Alliance
Association of University Administrators
Australian Uranium Association

Union
American Union of Associationists, national organization of supporters of Fourierism in the United States from 1846 to 1851

University
Adventist University of Africa
Agricultural University of Athens
American University of Antigua College of Medicine
American University of Armenia
Atlantic University Alliance, Ireland

Others
The IATA airport code for Queen Beatrix International Airport in Oranjestad, Aruba
Austrian Airlines (ICAO code)
As-Salamu Alaykum, a traditional Islamic greeting.

Aua may refer to :
 Aua, American Samoa, a village in American Samoa
 Aua (Neuenstein), a village in Hesse, Germany
 Aua Island, an island in Bismarck Archipelago part of Western Islands, Papua New Guinea
 Aua, Reef Islands, one of the Reef Islands of the Solomon Islands province of Temotu
 Aua (Inuit), an Inuit angakkuq (shaman)
 Aua (New Zealand), the Maori (indigenous) name for King Billy Island